Write and Fight is a 1985 Polish film directed by Wojciech Jerzy Has, starring Wojciech Wysocki, Zdzislaw Wardejnc and Jan Peszek. The film is an adaptation of a novel by Wladyslaw Terlecki and tells the story of a young journalist locked in a prison cell with a safebreaker and a priest, and the stories they tell.

Plot
Set during the First World War, Raphael (Wojciech Wysocki), is a young journalist with literary ambitions who is arrested and put in prison for publishing an anti-clerical magazine called "The Devil". There he is given a cell with a famous safecracker (Zdzislaw Wardejn) and Sixtus (Jan Peszek), a taciturn former monk charged with murder. The writer forms the idea for a novel based on the stories his cellmates share, however when he contracts typhoid fever it becomes hard for him to distinguish what is real and what is imaginary.

Cast
   Grzegorz Heromiński as Hunchback		
   Gustaw Holoubek as Investigating Judge		
   Gabriela Kownacka as Maria
   Andrzej Krukowski as Gruźlik
   Janusz Michalowski as Prison Doctor	
   Hanna Mikuć as Sixtus' lover
   Jan Peszek as Sixtus	
   Zdzislaw Wardejn as Boxer	
   Wojciech Wysocki as Raphael
   Jerzy Zelnik as Writer
   Marzena Trybal as the safecracker's friend
   Gustaw Lutkiewicz as warden
   John Paul Raven as jailer
   Jerzy Zygmunt Nowak as the agent who arrested Raphael
   Andrew Szenajch as officer
   Jerzy Moes as Austrian officer

Release
The film was released on 23 September 1985.

See also
 Cinema of Poland
 List of Polish language films

References

External links
 

1985 films
Polish drama films
1980s Polish-language films
Films directed by Wojciech Has
Films based on Polish novels